Traffickers is a 2012 South Korean crime thriller film starring Im Chang-jung, Choi Daniel, Oh Dal-su and Jo Yoon-hee. It takes place in six hours on a passenger boat with an ongoing black market organ-trafficking operation, and a desperate husband out to find his missing wife.

Plot
After his best friend dies in an unexpected accident, the black market dealer Young-gyu decides to wash his hands of his illegal activities and start a new life. He then falls in love with an acquaintance, Yu-Ri, who is unaware of his feelings and of his past. He later learns that Yu-ri needs money for her father's surgery, and she  has resorted to procuring the services of a local organ broker, who is Young-gyu's former client. The broker promises to help her secure a legal organ donation but secretly relies on black market dealers like Young-gyu, who engage in multiple kidnappings and killings. To help her out, Young-gyu agrees to do the job one last time when he is once again approached by his former client. His smuggling ring gets back together for a final run, and they resume their M.O. of operating out of a ferry boat that runs between Korea and China, picking victims from among its passengers, abducting them from their rooms, harvesting their organs on board the ship while they are still alive yet restrained, and then brutally disposing of the bodies afterwards.

Meanwhile, a married couple, Sang-ho and Chae-hee (who is disabled and relies on a wheelchair), boards Young-gyu's ferry boat heading to Weihai, China. That very evening, just when the boat enters international waters where countries' laws cannot be enforced, Chae-hee suddenly goes missing, and all her pictures and belongings vanish without a trace. Young-gyu runs into Yu-ri on the same ship, and she claims to be the only witness to Chae-hee's disappearance...

Cast

Im Chang-jung - Young-gyu
Choi Daniel - Sang-ho
Oh Dal-su - Kyung-jae / "Old Man"
Jo Yoon-hee - Yu-ri
Jung Ji-yoon - Chae-hee
Jo Dal-hwan - Joon-sik
Lee Young-hoon - Dae-woong
Shin Seung-hwan - Dong-bae
Choi Il-hwa - Chul-soo
Lee Moon-soo - Dr. Oh
Heo Joon-seok - victim in prologue
Kim Jae-hwa - Gong Choon-ja
Go Jung-il - customs officer
Yoon Sang-ho - boat crew member
Song Yi-joo - Inspector Jang 
Park Se-yeong - Min-seo
Park Sung-taek - Choi 
Park Il-mok - office head
Son Jong-hak - company chairman
Gong Jung-hwan - Yong-chul 
Oh Sang-jin - police station reporter
Ra Mi-ran - female courier 1
Shin Hye-jeong - female courier 2

Awards and nominations
2012 Grand Bell Awards
Nomination - Best New Director - Kim Hong-sun
Nomination - Best New Actor - Choi Daniel

2012 Blue Dragon Film Awards
Best New Director - Kim Hong-sun
Nomination - Best New Actress - Jung Ji-yoon

2012 Korean Culture and Entertainment Awards 
Top Excellence Award, Actor in a Film - Im Chang-jung

References

External links 
 
 
 
 

2012 films
2012 crime thriller films
South Korean crime thriller films
Films about organized crime in South Korea
Films about organ trafficking
Films set in Shandong
Films shot in China
2010s Korean-language films
2012 directorial debut films
South Korean films based on actual events
2010s South Korean films